There Is a House Here is a Canadian documentary film by Alan Zweig, which premiered at the 2017 Toronto International Film Festival. Taking its name from the English translation of Igloolik, the film explores several visits by Zweig to the Canadian territory of Nunavut, accompanied by rock singer Lucie Idlout.

References

External links

2017 films
Canadian documentary films
Documentary films about Inuit in Canada
Films directed by Alan Zweig
Films shot in Nunavut
2017 documentary films
2010s Canadian films